Maurice Briand (9 June 1949 – 18 December 2022) was a French lawyer and politician of the Socialist Party (PS).

Biography
From 1983 to 1989, he was Mayor of Guingamp. He was a deputy of the National Assembly for Côtes-d'Armor's 4th constituency from 1981 to 1986 and again from 1988 to 1993. In 1985, a bomb attack targeted his office. In 2002, he endorsed Marie-Renée Oget for the seat. In 2008, he announced his retirement from politics.

Briand was married and the father of two children. He died on 18 December 2022, at the age of 73.

References

1949 births
2022 deaths
French lawyers
Socialist Party (France) politicians
Deputies of the 7th National Assembly of the French Fifth Republic
Deputies of the 8th National Assembly of the French Fifth Republic
Members of the Regional Council of Brittany
People from Côtes-d'Armor